Rear Admiral Mohammad Nurul Islam ncc, psc (BN) (retd) was a former chief of staff of Bangladesh Navy from 4 June 1995 to 3 June 1999.

References

See also

|-

Bangladeshi Navy admirals
Possibly living people
Year of birth missing
Chiefs of Naval Staff (Bangladesh)